Willsher is a surname. Notable people with the surname include:

 Edgar Willsher (1828–1885), English cricketer
 William Willsher (1814–1861), English cricketer, brother of Edgar
 Chris Willsher (born 1971), English musician, actor, and writer